This article refers to sports broadcasting contracts in the Netherlands. For a list of rights in other countries, see Sports television broadcast contracts.

Football

Leagues

Eredivisie: ESPN All matches live men's All highlights of all matches at NOS.
Eerste Divisie: ESPN All Friday games on a switch program and a selection of 2/3 matches a round live. 
Vrouwen Eredivisie: ESPN Sunday match live plus highlights of all games. Highlights also on NOS.
Premier League: Viaplay
EFL Championship: Viaplay
Bundesliga:Viaplay
2. Bundesliga:Viaplay
La Liga: Ziggo Sport Totaal & Ziggo Sport
Serie A: Ziggo Sport Totaal & Ziggo Sport
Ligue 1: Ziggo Sport Totaal & Ziggo Sport
Belgian Pro League: Ziggo Sport Totaal & Ziggo Sport Important matches only
Primeira Liga: Ziggo Sport Totaal & Ziggo Sport Important matches only
Scottish Premiership: Ziggo Sport Totaal & Ziggo Sport Important matches only
Süper Lig: Ziggo Sport Totaal & Ziggo Sport
Eliteserien: Discovery+
Major League Soccer: Apple TV Plus
J.League: YouTube
FA Women's Super League: Viaplay
Frauen-Bundesliga: Viaplay
Serie A Femminile: Viaplay
Liga F: DAZN
Damallsvenskan: Viaplay
Elitedivisionen: Viaplay

Domestic Cups

KNVB Beker: ESPN & FOX 2 games live in the earlier rounds, in the later stages all games are broadcast live. The late-evening game is also broadcast live on free-to-air channel Fox. 
Johan Cruijff Shield: ESPN
Beker van België: Ziggo Sport
English FA Cup: Ziggo Sport Totaal & Ziggo Sport
FA Community Shield: Ziggo Sport Totaal & Ziggo Sport
Football League Cup: Viaplay
Scottish Cup: Viaplay
DFB-Pokal: Ziggo Sport Totaal & Ziggo Sport
DFL-Supercup: Viaplay
Coupe de France: Viaplay
Trophée des Champions: Ziggo Sport Totaal & Ziggo Sport
Taça de Portugal:  Ziggo Sport Totaal & Ziggo Sport (final only)
Copa del Rey: Ziggo Sport Totaal & Ziggo Sport (through 2029)
Coppa Italia: Ziggo Sport Totaal & Ziggo Sport

International Club Competitions

UEFA Champions League: RTL7 (1 Game LIVE on Tuesday & Wednesday), Ziggo Sport Totaal (Selection of live games during group stage, all games live during the play-off round in the qualifications and during the knock-out rounds) & Ziggo Sport (Switch program with action from all matches in the group stage, live full matches first knockout round onwards and in the play-off round during qualifications). Highlights of all games on RTL7.  RTL7 has first choice for the live games. Ziggo Sport will have the exclusive rights starting in 2024/2025.  
UEFA Europa League: ESPN and Veronica Dutch club(s) LIVE on both Veronica and ESPN and a selection of top games on ESPN. Veronica has the first choice for live games. From the 2024/2025 season onwards, the exclusive rights switch to Ziggo Sport.
UEFA Europa Conference League: ESPN and SBS6. All Dutch clubs LIVE on ESPN,1 or 2 Dutch clubs on Veronica and a selection of top matches on ESPN. Veronica has the first choice for live games. If 2 Dutch clubs play in the UEL that matchday, Veronica doesn't show the UECL games. From the 2024/2025 season onwards, the exclusive rights switch to Ziggo Sport. 
UEFA Super Cup: RTL7 & Ziggo Sport
UEFA Youth League: Ziggo Sport Totaal & Ziggo Sport  (through 2021)
UEFA Women's Champions League: DAZN (through 2025)
Copa Libertadores: ESPN
Copa Sudamericana: ESPN
AFC Champions League: OneFootball (until 2022)
International Champions Cup: ESPN

International Matches

Netherlands national football team: Nations League, Qualification, and Friendly matches LIVE on NOS through 2028. Broadcasts are usually on NPO 1 or NPO 3. 
Other countries (exclude the Netherlands team): Ziggo Sport Totaal, Ziggo Sport & ESPN.
European Qualifiers: NOS (Netherlands matches only), Ziggo Sport Totaal & Ziggo Sport. (all matches, exclude the Netherlands team) (through 2028). 
Netherlands women's national football team: NOS & ESPN

International Tournaments

FIFA: NOS
FIFA World Cup (all 64 matches live)
FIFA U-20 World Cup
FIFA U-17 World Cup
FIFA Women's World Cup (all 52 matches live) Dutch National Team and Evening matches in Group Stage and all knockout matches LIVE on NPO 1. Other Group stage games live at nos.nl and in the NOS app.
FIFA U-20 Women's World Cup
FIFA U-17 Women's World Cup

 UEFA
UEFA European Championship: NOS all matches live
UEFA Nations League: NOS (Up to 7 matches including Netherlands matches and final), Ziggo Sport Totaal, & Ziggo Sport. (selection of live matches, with a switch program with action from all games on the Ziggo Sport and Ziggo Sport Select channels, exclude the Netherlands group matches) (through 2027)
UEFA European Under-21 Championship: NOS (Netherlands games and final live)
UEFA European Under-17 Championship: NOS & YouTube
UEFA Women's Championship: NOS All games live
UEFA Women's Under-17 Championship: NOS & YouTube
UEFA Futsal Euro 2022 NOS Netherlands matches, selected others, and every game from semi-final onwards.
Copa América: Ziggo Sport Totaal & Ziggo Sport
CONCACAF Gold Cup: Ziggo Sport Totaal & Ziggo Sport
Africa Cup of Nations: ESPN

Cycling
Tour de France: NOS & Eurosport
Giro d'Italia: Eurosport
Vuelta a España: NOS (Only weekend stages live) & Eurosport
All RCS races: Eurosport
BinckBank Tour: Eurosport
UCI Road World Championships: NOS
UCI Track Champions League: Eurosport, RTL7 & Videoland
UCI Cyclo-cross World Cup Eurosport (all rounds live and NOS (selected races live)
UCI Cyclo-cross World Championships Eurosport (all races live) and NOS (men and women elite races live)

Golf
Ryder Cup: Ziggo Sport Totaal & Ziggo Sport
PGA Tour: Discovery+
LIV Golf: Viaplay
PGA European Tour: Ziggo Sport Totaal & Ziggo Sport
Asian Tour: Ziggo Sport Totaal
LPGA: Ziggo Sport Totaal
Men's major golf championships: Ziggo Sport Totaal & Ziggo Sport
World Golf Championships: Ziggo Sport Totaal

Darts
PDC: Viaplay.
European Tour events: Viaplay.
Floor events: PDC.tv
WDF: Eurosport

Basketball
NBA: ESPN 6 matches per week
WNBA: Prime Video
NCAA College Basketball: ESPN
BNXT League: Ziggo Sport Totaal & Ziggo Sport
Euroleague: Ziggo Sport Totaal
Eurocup Basketball: Eurosport 
FIBA Europe Cup: Ziggo Sport

American Football
NFL: ESPN
NCAA College Football: ESPN

Australian Football
AFL: Eurosport & Discovery+

Baseball
MLB: ESPN 10 games per week
KBO: ESPN
Holland Series: NOS Important matches only.

Ice Hockey
NHL: ESPN 3 games per week
Stanley Cup: ESPN
Ice Hockey World Championships: ESPN

Field Hockey
Dutch Men's and Women's Hoofdklasse: Viaplay all games live. NOS selected games live and highlights.
FIH Men's and Women's Pro League: Ziggo Sport

Motor racing
24 hours of Le Mans: RTL 7 & Eurosport
FIA World Endurance Championship: Eurosport,  RTL7 (Le Mans only) and Videoland. 
Dakar Rally: RTL 7 1 hour highlight show.
Formula One: Viaplay all races live, Dutch GP and extended highlights on NOS. Also extended highlights on Ziggo Sport Totaal & Ziggo Sport.
Formula Two: Viaplay.
Formula Three: Viaplay
Formula E: Ziggo Sport Totaal & Ziggo Sport, and Eurosport.
DTM: Ziggo Sport Totaal & Ziggo Sport
World Touring Car Championship: Eurosport
Porsche Supercup: Viaplay, Eurosport and Ziggo Sport.
IndyCar Series: Ziggo Sport Totaal Highlights Ziggo Sport
NASCAR: Ziggo Sport Totaal Highlights Ziggo Sport
MotoGP: Ziggo Sport & Ziggo Sport Totaal & NOS (Dutch GP only and highlights of other races).
World Superbike Championship: Eurosport
Motocross World Championship: Eurosport & NOS
Motocross des Nations: Eurosport & NOS
FIA World Rallycross Championship: Ziggo Sport Totaal
European Rally Championship: Eurosport

Multi-discipline events
Olympic Games: Eurosport & NOS Eurosport has full rights, NOS has the rights for 2 live feeds starting in Paris 2024. Eurosport presents a switch program on their main channel, and a live event on the second channel. All live events are available on the premium Discovery+ service.

Track & Field
IAAF Diamond League: Ziggo Sport Totaal & Ziggo Sport
IAAF World Championships in Athletics: NOS

Tennis
Wimbledon: Eurosport & Ziggo Sport Totaal & Ziggo Sport. Eurosport holds the exclusive rights for the Dutch players.
Australian Open: Eurosport
French Open: Eurosport
US Open: Eurosport
ATP Finals: Ziggo Sport Totaal & Ziggo Sport
ATP Tour Masters 1000: Ziggo Sport Totaal & Ziggo Sport
ATP Tour 500: Ziggo Sport Totaal & Ziggo Sport
ATP Tour 250: Ziggo Sport Totaal & Ziggo Sport 
WTA Finals: Ziggo Sport Totaal & Ziggo Sport 
WTA 1000: Ziggo Sport Totaal & Ziggo Sport 
WTA 500: Ziggo Sport Totaal & Ziggo Sport 
WTA 250: Ziggo Sport Totaal & Ziggo Sport 
Davis Cup: Ziggo Sport Totaal & Ziggo Sport
Fed Cup: Ziggo Sport Totaal & Ziggo Sport

Rugby
Six Nations Championship: Ziggo Sport Totaal & Ziggo Sport
Rugby World Cup: Ziggo Sport Totaal & Ziggo Sport
Rugby World Cup Sevens: Ziggo Sport Totaal & Ziggo Sport
Aviva Premiership Rugby: ESPN

Fishing
Fish'O'Mania: Viaplay

FightingBellator MMA: Paramount Network
Bushido MMA: DAZN: October 2022 to October 2025, all fightsCage Warriors: Discovery+CAGE MMA: ViaplayDream Boxing: DAZN: October 2022 to October 2025, all fightsEnfusion: ViaplayEFC: Extreme Sports ChannelGlory: Videoland
Golden Boy: DAZNInvicta FC: Viaplay
King of Kings: DAZN: October 2022 to October 2025, all fightsKSW: Viaplay
Matchroom: DAZNPFL: ViaplayONE Championship: YouTubeUFC: Discovery+ (all events live) & Eurosport (selection of events live and highlights of all-)World Fighting League: Paramount NetworkWWE: Veronica & KIJK streaming service.

VolleyballFIVB World Championship|Fivb World Championship: Ziggo Sport Totaal European Volleyball Championship: Ziggo Sports TotaalCEV Champions League: Ziggo Sports TotaalVolleyball Nations League: Ziggo Sports Totaal CEV Cup: Ziggo Sports Totaal

 Winter sports International Biathlon Union: EurosportInternational Ski Federation: EurosportInternational Skating Union: Nederlandse Omroep Stichting (Speed skating & Short Track Speed Skating), Eurosport (Figure Skating)

 Snooker Tour Championship: Ziggo Sport Totaal & Ziggo Sport.Champion of Champions: Viaplay.Championship League: Viaplay
 All other TV Events: Eurosport

 Pool Mosconi Cup: ViaplayU.S. Open Pool Championship: ViaplayWorld Cup of Pool: ViaplayWorld Pool Championship: ViaplayWorld Pool Masters''': Viaplay

References

Netherlands
Television in the Netherlands